Mumtaz is a restaurant group based in the City of Bradford, West Yorkshire, England.  The company owns three restaurants, with the original flagship Mumtaz Restaurant being sited on Great Horton Road in Bradford. The Mumtaz is one of the best-known restaurants in Bradford. The group opened the second restaurant in Bradford in 2008 and In Leeds in 2010. The latest edition of the Mumtaz chain was opened in Manchester in 2016. 

Apart from restaurants, the group also runs the Mumtaz Food Industries food processing division – one of the main factories, with office blocks and warehouses located in Mytholmroyd, West Yorkshire. The group also works closely with the Bradford College.

The Mumtaz Group is the first company to launch Halal baby food. The group has factories in Spain, Switzerland, Pakistan, Malaysia, and France that export to over 36 countries.

Between 2010 and 2014, the group operated a series of franchise outlets known as "Jaldi Jaldi". The first Jaldi Jaldi outlet was opened in April 2010, in Leeds, by James Caan. Most stores closed in 2013, with the final outlet, based at Leeds University Union closing on 27 April, 2014.

Mumtaz Khan Akbar 
Mumtaz Khan Akbar is the founder and owner of the Mumtaz brand. He was born in Mera Qadir, Azad Kashmir, Pakistan on 10 February 1959 and joined his family in Britain in 1972. Mumtaz Khan is reported as one of the richest men in Yorkshire and Lancashire, with a personal wealth of £94 million (2016).

He was disqualified from being a company director by the High Court in Leeds on 16 November 2017 following an investigation by the Insolvency Service. The disqualification began on 8 December 2017.

Disqualification of directors 
On 9 February 2018, Dr Gul-Nawaz Khan Akbar, Mumtaz Khan Akbar, Rab Nawaz Khan Akbar, Fameeda Akbar, and Kauser Akbar, were disqualified relating to their directorships of Greentabs Ltd (trading, as Mumtaz Food Industries Ltd).

On 24 May 2013, Greentabs Ltd (Mumtaz Food Industries Ltd’) went into voluntary liquidation owing £805,630 and during the proceedings it was discovered Dr Gul-Nawaz Khan Akbar, managing director had used company funds to buy £976,055 gold bullion for his sole benefit between 30 November 2012 and 11 December 2012, will full knowledge of the board of directors whilst £447,997 remained unpaid to creditors.

Dr Gul-Nawaz Khan Akbar was banned for six years, his two brothers were banned three years for facilitating the transaction, his wife and the wife of his brother, the founder of the Mumtaz Group (Mumtaz Khan Akbar) each received two years ban for failing to uphold corporate governance.

2018 tax case
In 2018 HM Revenue and Customs began proceedings against members and former members of the Mumtaz Group, after failing to consistently pay corporate taxes on time. HMRC required the company pay an advance bond in order to continue selling taxable goods, members of the group knowingly failed to pay the bond and legal proceedings were undertaken.

Racial discrimination
In January 2021, a former employee won an employment tribunal after a judge found the company had acted unlawfully through racial discrimination and unfair dismissal. A white employee was told by his supervisor that he wouldn't be able to understand how to cook the food as he was white, and that he "should go and work for an English company". When he complained about his supervisor's comments, no disciplinary action was taken against the supervisor, and the employee was dismissed from the company.

See also 
 British Asians

References 

Pakistani cuisine in the United Kingdom
Companies based in Bradford
Restaurants established in 1979
1979 establishments in England